The 2014 Louisville Cardinals football team represented the University of Louisville in the 2014 NCAA Division I FBS football season. The Cardinals were  led by head coach Bobby Petrino, who began his second stint at Louisville after eight years away, seven of which were spent as a head coach at other colleges and in the National Football League (NFL). The team played its 17th season at Papa John's Cardinal Stadium in Louisville, Kentucky. They were in their first season as members of the Atlantic Coast Conference, having replaced departed member Maryland in the Atlantic Division. They finished the season 9–4, 5–3 in ACC play to finish in third place in the Atlantic Division. They were invited to the Belk Bowl, where they lost to Georgia.

Schedule

Source:

Game summaries

Miami

13th meeting. 2–9–1 all time. Last meeting 2013, Cardinals 36–9.

Murray State
19th meeting. 12–6 all time. Last meeting 2011, Cardinals 21–9.

Virginia
3rd meeting. Tied 1–1. Last meeting 1989, Cavaliers 16–15.

FIU
4th meeting. 2–1 all time. Last meeting 2013, Cardinals 72–0.

Wake Forest
2nd meeting. 1–0 all time. Last meeting 2007, 24-13 Cardinals.

Syracuse
2nd meeting. Tied 6–6. Last meeting 2012, 45-26 Orange.

Clemson
1st meeting.

NC State
5th meeting. 3–1 all time. Last meeting 2011, Wolfpack 31–24.

Florida State
15th meeting. 2–12 all time. Last meeting 2002, Cardinals 26–20.

Boston College
7th meeting. Tied 3–3. Last meeting 1998, Cardinals 52–28.

Notre Dame
1st meeting.

Kentucky
27th meeting. 12–14 all time. Last meeting 2013, Cardinals 27–13.

Coaching staff

Rankings

References

Louisville
Louisville Cardinals football seasons
Louisville Cardinals football